Hilara brevistyla is a species of fly in the family Empididae. It is found in the  Palearctic .

References

External links
Images representing Hilara brevistyla at BOLD

Empididae
Insects described in 1927
Asilomorph flies of Europe